Mahmud Abouhalima (born December 14, 1958) is an Egyptian citizen who is convicted as perpetrator of the 1993 World Trade Center bombing. He is currently serving a 67-year sentence at ADX Florence in Florence, Colorado for his role in the bombing.

Life

Born to a mill foreman in Kafr Dawar, Egypt, Abouhalima spent his adolescence with the Al-Gama'a al-Islamiyya, an outlawed Islamic group that heralded Omar Abdel Rahman as their spiritual leader. He briefly attended Alexandria University, but dropped out and left Egypt altogether in 1981, moving to Germany. There, he later recalled he had lived a life "of corruption - girls, drugs, you name it".

The following year, Germany denied him political asylum, and he quickly married Renate Soika, a troubled German woman, which guaranteed he could remain in the country. He divorced Soika three years later but in short order married another woman named Marianne Weber in a Muslim ceremony. He flew to Brooklyn with his new wife and after his American tourist visa expired, applied for amnesty claiming to be an agricultural worker and was accepted as a permanent resident under the Immigration Reform and Control Act of 1986.

He worked as a New York City cabdriver for five years from 1986–1991, though he saw his license suspended ten times during that period, for failing to attend traffic court for cab violations including traffic violations and an attempt to overcharge a customer.

In his free time, Abouhalima worked long hours for a non-profit group in Brooklyn that raised money for the Afghan Mujahideen.

Militancy
Abouhalima travelled to Afghanistan in 1988, saying he wanted to prove he "was a Muslim, not a sheep", and received combat-training in Peshawar.

Ali Mohamed, a sergeant at Fort Bragg, provided United States Army manuals and other assistance to individuals at the al-Farouq Mosque, and some members including Abouhalima and El Sayyid Nosair practiced at the Calverton Shooting Range on Long Island, many of the group wearing t-shirts reading "Help Each Other in Goodness and Piety...A Muslim to a Muslim is a Brick Wall" with a map of Afghanistan emblazoned in the middle. Abouhalima wore an NRA cap during their practices. When Nosair assassinated Meir Kahane, Abouhalima was driving the purported getaway car, although Nosair accidentally jumped into another cab by mistake.

He was the subject of an FBI investigation through January 1993, at which point the investigation was called off, shortly before the World Trade Center bombing. On February 26, 1993, the day of the WTC bombing, he was seen by several witnesses with Mohammed A. Salameh at the Jersey City storage facility allegedly used to prepare the explosives.

Capture
Abouhalima fled to Saudi Arabia, and then back to his native Egypt where he was captured by Egyptian police, tortured, and handed back to the United States, imprisoned in a cocoon of duct tape.

In March 1994, Abouhalima was sentenced to 240 years in prison. After an appeal, the sentence was later reduced to 1,300 months. In 2021, one of Abouhalima's convictions were overturned, cutting his sentence by 30 years. He is currently an inmate at ADX Florence in Florence, Colorado. He is scheduled for release on March 8, 2060. Abouhalima's Federal Bureau of Prisons ID# is 28064-054.

References

1958 births
Living people
Al-Qaeda bombers
Egyptian al-Qaeda members
People imprisoned on charges of terrorism
People from Beheira Governorate
Inmates of ADX Florence
Egyptian people imprisoned abroad
Egyptian torture victims
20th-century criminals
Egyptian mass murderers